Rio Salado College is a public community college headquartered in Tempe, Arizona United States.  It is part of the Maricopa County Community College District and accredited by The Higher Learning Commission.  It offers associate degree and certificate programs in online, in-person, and hybrid formats.

History 
Rio Salado College was founded on March 14, 1978 as one of 10 Maricopa Community Colleges. At the time, the college offered remote classrooms in 180 facilities throughout the Valley of the Sun. Rio Salado College offered its first online classes in 1996 and by 2006 had converted a majority of its course offerings to an online format. The school is recognized as a leader in higher education innovation, specializing in online education and distance learning.

Accreditation 
Rio Salado College is accredited by The Higher Learning Commission.

Campuses

Tempe Headquarters
The administrative headquarters of Rio Salado College are in Tempe, Arizona. Rio Salado relocated from its original location in Phoenix to Tempe in 1996. The Tempe location houses three main buildings: The Conference Center at Rio, the Tower at Rio, and the Rio at Hohokam administrative building.

Satellite Locations
Rio Salado College is affiliated with 15 physical locations across Maricopa county including 11 RSC locations, two Communiversities, SPOT 127 Youth Media Center and the East Valley Veterans Education Center. Services and hours of operation vary by location. The college also provides educational services through its incarcerated re-entry program at ASPC-Lewis and ASPC-Perryville. In addition to College Bridge Pathways programming that includes: Adult Basic Education, Adult Secondary Education, Adults Achieving a College Education, High School Equivalency preparation, English Language Acquisition for Adults and STAR-Path Model options at Avondale, RSC Lifelong Learning Center, and RSC Thomas.

School of Dental Hygiene
The Rio Salado College School of Dental Hygiene offers an accredited dental hygiene program. The school has been training students since 1998. It is a partnership between Rio Salado College, The Arizona Dental Association and Delta Dental Insurance. The School of Dental Hygiene moved from the West Valley to its current location at the Tempe HQ in 2012.

Notable alumni
 Jessica Jaymes, pornographic actress

References

External links
 Official website

Maricopa County Community College District
Distance education institutions based in the United States
Education in Tempe, Arizona
Educational institutions established in 1978
Community colleges in Arizona
Buildings and structures in Tempe, Arizona
Universities and colleges in Maricopa County, Arizona